The 2022–23 Denver Pioneers men's ice hockey season will be the 74th season of play for the program. They represent the University of Denver in the 2022–23 NCAA Division I men's ice hockey season and 10th season in the National Collegiate Hockey Conference (NCHC). The Pioneers will be coached by David Carle, in his fifth season, and play their home games at Magness Arena.

Season

Departures

Recruiting

Roster
As of August 26, 2022.

Standings

Schedule and results

|-
!colspan=12 style=";" | Exhibition

|-
!colspan=12 style=";" | 

|-
!colspan=12 style=";" | Regular Season

|-
!colspan=12 style=";" | 

|-
!colspan=12 style=";" |

Scoring statistics

Goaltending statistics

Rankings

USCHO did not release a poll in weeks 1 and 13.

References

2022-23
Denver Pioneers
Denver Pioneers
Denver Pioneers
Denver Pioneers